Elections to the French National Assembly were held in Upper Volta on 2 January 1956, as part of the wider French elections. The results saw Gérard Kango Ouédraogo (Progressive Voltaic), Nazi Boni (African Popular Movement), Joseph Conombo and Henri Guissou (Social Party for the Emancipation of the African Masses) elected.

Results

References

Upper Volta
1956 in French Upper Volta
Elections in Burkina Faso